The Maltese Falcon may refer to:

Arts and entertainment
 The Maltese Falcon (novel), detective novel by Dashiell Hammett published in 1930, and its film adaptations:
 The Maltese Falcon (1931 film), starring Ricardo Cortez and directed by Roy Del Ruth
 The Maltese Falcon (1941 film), starring Humphrey Bogart and directed by John Huston

People
 Tony Drago (born 1965), snooker player from Malta nicknamed The Maltese Falcon
 Alex Vella (born 1954), National President of Rebels Motorcycle Club in Australia, nicknamed The Maltese Falcon
 George Beurling (born 1921),  fighter pilot recognised as "Canada's most famous hero of Second World War", as "The Falcon of Malta"

Other uses
 Falco peregrinus brookei, aka the Maltese Falcon, Mediterranean region subspecies of peregrine falcon
 Tribute of the Maltese Falcon, annual tribute (a peregrine falcon) to Emperor Charles V, Holy Roman Emperor and his mother Queen Joanna of Castile
 The Maltese Falcon (yacht), distinctive superyacht, first to feature square sails on carbon fibre masts

See also
 Maltese Falcon Society, an organization for admirers of Dashiell Hammett, his novel The Maltese Falcon, and hard-boiled mystery books and writers in general